The Pink Panther: Passport to Peril is an adventure computer game (released on October 31, 1996) that teaches children about six countries with the Pink Panther. The countries Pink visits are: England, Egypt, China, Bhutan, India and Australia.

The Pink Panther: Hokus Pokus Pink is a sequel to Passport to Peril that was released on October 18, 1997.

Plot 
The Pink Panther is sent by Inspector Clouseau, his employer in this game, to Camp ChillyWawa, a summer camp for gifted children, to protect the camp from a mysterious threat. Once there, he meets a group of multiethnic youths as well as the Little Man stock character from Pink's animated shorts in the role of a camp counselor. He also reconnects with an old friend of his, Von Schmarty, a scientist and caricature of Albert Einstein who shows him his numerous inventions.

Soon after Pink arrives, the children start acting strangely and contradictory to their nature, hating their camping experience despite Pink's every effort to appease them. Pink finds himself traveling around the world, followed by three dogs who claim to represent the "Better Camping Bureau", to solve the mystery and restore order to the camp.

Armed with a PDA (which stands for "Pink Digital Assistant") that contains information on the indigenous people, languages, clothing, entertainment, art, history, nature, and foods of each pertinent country in the game, Pink travels the globe fulfilling various tasks based on the children's needs and whereabouts. He eventually gathers enough evidence to prove that the dogs' leader, the Dogfather, intends to ruin Camp ChillyWawa's reputation so it will be closed down, allowing him to open a lucrative fast food restaurant in its place. The Dogfather then reveals to Pink that he replaced the camp's children with robotic clones programmed to hate the camp unconditionally. Pink engages in a final confrontation with the Dogfather and his henchmen, Pugg and Louie, as well as a traitorous Little Man that ends with all four villains sucked into a powered suction pump and the captured children released. The game ends as he quits working for Clouseau after being told his next mission is an undercover cafeteria worker.

References

External links

Windows games
Windows-only games
Passport To Peril
1996 video games
Adventure games
MGM Interactive games
Point-and-click adventure games
ScummVM-supported games
Video games developed in the United States
Video games set in the United Kingdom
Video games set in Australia
Video games set in Egypt
Video games set in India
Video games set in Bhutan
Video games set in China
Single-player video games
BMG Interactive games
Simon & Schuster Interactive games